Real People is the fourth studio album by American R&B band Chic, released on Atlantic Records in 1980. It includes the singles "Rebels Are We" (US R&B #8, Pop #61), "Real People" (#51 R&B, #79 Pop), and "26" (issued only in the UK).

The album was one of four written and produced by Bernard Edwards and Nile Rodgers in 1980, the other three being Sister Sledge's Love Somebody Today, Sheila and B. Devotion's King of the World, and Diana Ross' multi-platinum selling album Diana.

The album peaked at #30 on the US Albums chart and #8 on the US R&B chart, a modest commercial success in comparison both to the Diana Ross project and their previous albums, most likely due to the so-called "anti-disco backlash".  Though in spite of the backlash, all of the album cuts peaked at #29 on the American dance charts.

Real People was released on CD by Atlantic Records/Warner Music in 1991. It was digitally remastered and reissued by Wounded Bird Records in 2003.

Critical reception 

In a contemporary review for The Village Voice, Robert Christgau deemed Real People a better record than Chic's Risqué (1979), even though it lacked a song as great as "Good Times". "Jumpy, scintillating rhythms fuse with elegantly abrasive textures for a funk that's not light but sharp", he wrote. "Plus post-chic words that go with the attention-grabbing heat and invention of Nile Rodgers's postrock guitar." In his year-end list for the Pazz & Jop critics poll, Christgau named it the 15th best album of 1980.

AllMusic's Alex Henderson was less impressed in a retrospective review, calling Real People a satisfactory effort but inessential, highlighted by "Rebels Are We", "I Got Protection", and "Chip Off the Old Block", none of which he said were as good as Chic's past hits.

Track listing
All tracks written by Bernard Edwards and Nile Rodgers.

Side A
"Open Up" – 3:52
"Real People" – 5:20 
"I Loved You More" – 3:06
"I Got Protection" – 6:22

Side B
"Rebels Are We" – 4:53 
"Chip Off the Old Block" – 4:56
"26" – 3:57 
"You Can't Do It Alone" – 4:39

Personnel
 Luci Martin – lead vocals (A2, A3, B1)
 Alfa Anderson – lead vocals (A4, B2)
 Fonzi Thornton – lead vocals (B4)
 Michelle Cobbs – vocals
 Nile Rodgers – guitar, vocals
 Andy Schwartz – keyboards
 Raymond Jones – keyboards
 Bernard Edwards – bass guitar; lead vocals (B3)
 Tony Thompson – drums
 Sammy Figueroa – percussion
 The Chic Strings:
 Valerie Heywood – strings
 Cheryl Hong – strings
 Karen Milne – strings
 Gene Orloff – conductor

Production
 Bernard Edwards – producer for Chic Organization Ltd.
 Nile Rodgers – producer for Chic Organization Ltd.
 Bob Clearmountain – engineer
 Lucy Laurie – assistant engineer
 Jeff Hendrickson – assistant engineer
 Garry Rindfuss – assistant engineer
 Dennis King – mastering
 Bob Defrin – art direction
 Bob Kiss – photography
 All songs recorded and mixed at The Power Station, New York City.
 Mastered at Atlantic Studios, NY.

References 

Chic (band) albums
1980 albums
Atlantic Records albums
Albums produced by Nile Rodgers
Albums produced by Bernard Edwards